A platform gap (also known technically as the platform train interface or PTI in some countries) is the space between a train car (or other mass transit vehicle) and the edge of the station platform, often created by geometric constraints, historic legacies, or use of partially compatible equipment.

Many high-quality bus rapid transit (BRT) systems also use high platforms at station stops to allow fast and efficient level boarding and alighting, but potentially leaving hazardous gaps between the platforms and the buses. Alignment setups such as Kassel curbs help to reduce platform gaps without requiring time-consuming manual alignment at each BRT station stop.

Straight platforms
The ideal platform would be straight and align perfectly with a train or other large vehicle. Even in this case, a small gap between the conveyances and the platform is necessary to allow the vehicles to move freely without rubbing against the platform edge.  In 2007, the Long Island Rail Road regarded an  platform gap as typical on its non-curved platforms.

Curved platforms

In real-world situations, stations are often constrained by limited space, legacy designs, and track geometry or roadway layout.  Stations may have to use a compromise design, with a platform curved in a way that will allow a vehicle or train to arrive and depart without mechanical interference, but which leaves unavoidable horizontal and possibly vertical gaps between the cars and the platform edge.  These spaces are caused by the geometric gap between a curve (circular arc or otherwise) and the straight-line chord or tangent formed by a railcar or bus in proximity to a platform.  These types of gaps are geometrically intrinsic, and cannot be eliminated as long as the platform is located on a curved or banked segment of track or guideway.

When passenger car doors are located only at the ends of each car (a common design for commuter rail and long-distance trains), platform access from a concave platform is preferred, since this brings the car ends in closest proximity to the platform edge.  By contrast, a convex platform would leave the largest possible gaps between the car ends and the platform edge, making this design undesirable and thus rarely implemented. 

An example of platforms designed for access from the concave side is at Lansdowne station in Boston, where side platforms for both the inbound and outbound directions are located to reduce platform gaps to commuter rail trains of the Framingham/Worcester Line. Concave and convex gaps also exist in several MTR stations in Hong Kong, particularly on the East Rail line, which was built on the historic Kowloon–Canton Railway line.

Gap fillers

Mechanical platform edge extensions known as platform gap fillers may be used to bridge the gap between platform and vehicle.  These stopgaps require careful alignment of the vehicle upon arrival, and careful synchronization to avoid serious damage caused by departure of the vehicle before the extenders are fully retracted.  They increase station dwell time, and introduce safety and maintenance concerns of their own.

Alternatively, the gap fillers may be mounted on the train, and linked to the door operating mechanism. They may be found on modern trainsets, like various versions of the Stadler GTW. Train-mounted gap fillers eliminate the need for careful alignment and, as the driver only gets the signal that the doors have closed when the fillers have fully retracted, require no special synchronization on departure.  Moving all active components of the system to the train instead of the platform allows maintenance to be performed in a shop, rather than in the field.  Singapore has committed to specifying its newer trains with gap fillers, to reduce the incidence of platform gap accidents in its crowded stations.

On the Berlin U-Bahn, which has two different loading gauges (Kleinprofil on U1-U4 and Großprofil on U5-U9), so-called Blumenbretter ("flower boards") bridging the platform gap were attached to Kleinprofil trains that ran on Großprofil lines at various times of rolling stock shortage.

Equipment compatibility
In some rail systems, significant platform gaps may also occur (both horizontally and vertically) because of equipment and platforms designed to different and somewhat incompatible height and width standards.  This situation may occur especially when previously separate rail systems are consolidated, or start to interoperate, thus allowing equipment to be moved onto tracks where it had not been used before.

In 2007, public testimony by the acting president of the Long Island Rail Road cited the need to interoperate with freight service and other passenger services such as New Jersey Transit and Amtrak, in addition to its own diverse rolling stock, as complicating and slowing efforts to deal with platform gap hazards.

Other contributing factors
Other variables that can increase platform gaps include rail wear, wheel wear, condition of the railcar suspension, and passenger load. A further complication is super-elevation, deliberate tilting of the railbed to allow faster travel around curves.  This factor is especially relevant on systems where some express trains (such as long-distance Amtrak trains) operate non-stop through local stations located on curves.  Higher pass-through speeds also increase railcar sway, requiring even larger physical clearances to avoid platform strikes.

Specifications and limits

In the US, the Americans with Disabilities Act requires that platforms be “readily accessible to and usable by individuals with disabilities, including individuals who use wheelchairs (49 CFR Part 37, Appendix A, 10.3.1 (9))”.  However, this rule only applies to new construction or major renovations of stations. A 2009 report to the New Jersey Department of Transportation (NJDOT) observes that ADA rules specify that "At stations with high level platforms, there may be a gap of no more than 3” horizontal and 5/8" vertical between platform edge and entrance to the rail car. However, currently no passenger rail system in the U.S. has been able to achieve this without the use of manually operated 'bridge plates'.”

Mitigation
Physical measures to reduce platform gaps may include realigning trackbeds, realigning platform slabs, and extending platform edges with wooden boards.  Operational measures may include "zoning off" some railcars (not opening certain doors at problematic stations), relocating where trains stop along a lengthy platform, and temporarily deploying "platform conductor" personnel to assist passengers.

On systems where the floor level of the vehicle and the platform height closely match, an extendible platform can be installed below the doors of the vehicle, to deploy when the doors are opened. This significantly decreases the gap and thus the risks when boarding and alighting vehicles at stations or stops. This method is used by the German BR423 EMU's and its derivatives, including the Dutch variant SLT.

A public awareness campaign may be used, employing visually distinct platform edge markings, posters, signs, public safety announcements, and web videos to increase safety awareness. The MTA Long Island Rail Road website lists some precautions passengers should observe regarding platform gaps.

An article in The Guardian conceded that some passengers who have fallen into platform gaps were drunk at the time, but pointed out other incidents when victims did not have that impairment.

Incidents and accidents

An incident once occurred involving Robert Todd Lincoln (son of American president Abraham Lincoln) and a platform gap in Jersey City, New Jersey during the American Civil War. While waiting on a crowded train platform, Robert Lincoln was pushed against the train, and the train started to move, dropping his feet into the gap.  He was saved from possible serious injury or death by the prompt actions of well-known actor Edwin Booth (the brother of John Wilkes Booth, who a few months later would assassinate President Lincoln).

A 2009 American report identified platform gap injury risk factors, including "mobility, being elderly, having disabilities (visual impairment), being accompanied by small children or incidents occurring to small children, behavior of other passengers such as pushing or jostling, carry luggage and other articles, alcohol, degraded platform conditions such as crowding, wet platforms or uneven platforms, and stepping distances".

In 2014, a news service in Mumbai, India reported several serious platform gap mutilation incidents and a death within a few months, mostly attributed to crowded conditions. In 2015, Singapore had at least two platform gap incidents which were eventually resolved, but caused significant disruptions in rush-hour service.

In 2014 in Perth, Australia, an accident occurred when a man fell between the platform and the train, and could not release his leg because the gap was too small. Other passengers "rocked" the carriage sideways to increase the gap, allowing the victim to escape.

In 2022 in Duvvada, India, a girl who was standing at the door for alighting was knocked down by the door due to a sudden jerk, and she fell into the gap between coach and the platform, In spite of immediate rescue efforts launched by authorities to free her, it took almost an hour to cut the platform and rush her to the hospital. Injuries to her internal organs led to her death within a day.

See also

References

Further reading

 London Underground platform gaps

Railway platforms
Railway safety
Accessibility